Amanita (né Alexander Erashov; b. 1972 in Ermak) is a Russian artist who specializes in works on paper and graphic drawing. His works have appeared in museums and galleries around the world.

Early life and work 
Alexander Erashov was born in Ermak, Kazakh Soviet Socialist Republic, in 1972. The name “Amanita” is the translation of the Russian word "mukhomor", Amanita's first pseudonym. He attended the faculty of graphic design at the Pavlodarsky Arts College from 2000–2004, specialising in book and editorial illustration, caricatures, original font creation, heraldry and poster design. 
Amanita held his first exhibition at the Aina Gallery in Pavlodar, Kazakhstan, in 2005.

International recognition 
In 2012, Amanita took part in the “From Utopia to Dystopia” international project at the Art Hall gallery in Kiev, Ukraine, and in the “Art of the Nation” project at the New Tretyakov Gallery in Moscow. He designed the catalogue for the Kiev project with Ivan Khivrenko, Dasha Namdakova and Aleksandr Savko.
In 2013, Amanita took part in the Art Budapest international art fair. Since then, has been exhibiting in London: at the Phillips Auction House’s pre-auction exhibition (2014), the Bird & Carrot Gallery, with his “Encyclopaedia” exhibition (2015) and at the international Works on Paper art fair at the Royal Geographical Institute (2016). At the Works on Paper Fair in London, the prices for Amanita's drawings ranged from £4,800 to £6,000.

Style and technique 

For many years, Aleksandr Erashov worked as an engineer in an electric power station in Kazakhstan, only drawing in the evenings. He told FinBuzz Magazine that this habit was his way of escaping reality: “I didn’t grow up in an artistic milieu, without any museums, without the internet; I was always on my own.”
Amanita uses rapidograph pens, pencil, pens and ink, reflecting the limited choices of mediums and tools of Soviet amateur artists, who didn’t have access to oil paint, reserved for members of the official Union of Soviet artists.

Themes 

Amanita’s graphic sheets are inspired by scholastic treatises about universe order. The results are often works that are almost encyclopedic in their nature, featuring elements of European and Asian culture and the Soviet and post-Soviet spaces.

References

External links 

 Amanita official website (in English)
 Amanita's profile on the Works on Paper art fair website

Russian painters
1972 births
Living people
21st-century Russian artists